JVS may refer to:

 Jamaican vomiting sickness
 JAMMA Video Standard, a standard for arcade machines
 Joseph Vissarionovich Stalin, General Secretary of the Communist Party of the Soviet Union
 Journal of Vaishnava Studies
 Journal of Vascular Surgery
 Josephson voltage standard

See also

 
 JV (disambiguation)
 JSV (disambiguation)
 SJV (disambiguation)
 SVJ (disambiguation)
 VJS (disambiguation)